Tigran Gyokchyan (in Armenian Տիգրան Գյոկչյան, in Western Armenian Տիգրան Կէօքճեան; born January 3, 1965) is an Armenian basketball coach who currently coaches the Lebanese women's national basketball team and is the head coach for Armenian basketball team BC Dvin.

Coaching career
In 2016 Gyokchyan as coach of Armenia national basketball team, he led them to their first ever European basketball title, helping them win the FIBA European Championship for Small Countries, defeating the hosts Andorra national basketball team in the final 79–71.

Personal life
His son, Hayk, is a notable basketball player who plays for Homenetmen Beirut B.C. and the Lebanese national team, also played 2015-2016 season with the lebanese club Hekmeh BC.

References

External links
Profile at FIBA.com
Profile at Asia-Basket.com

Lebanese people of Armenian descent
Living people
1965 births
Basketball coaches of international teams